This article lists mathematical identities, that is, identically true relations holding in mathematics.

 Bézout's identity (despite its usual name, it is not, properly speaking, an identity)
 Binomial inverse theorem
 Binomial identity
 Brahmagupta–Fibonacci two-square identity
 Candido's identity
 Cassini and Catalan identities
 Degen's eight-square identity
 Difference of two squares
 Euler's four-square identity
 Euler's identity
 Fibonacci's identity see Brahmagupta–Fibonacci identity or Cassini and Catalan identities
 Heine's identity
 Hermite's identity
 Lagrange's identity
 Lagrange's trigonometric identities
 MacWilliams identity
 Matrix determinant lemma
 Newton's identity
 Parseval's identity
 Pfister's sixteen-square identity
 Sherman–Morrison formula
 Sophie Germain identity
 Sun's curious identity
 Sylvester's determinant identity
 Vandermonde's identity
 Woodbury matrix identity

Identities for classes of functions

 Exterior calculus identities
 Fibonacci identities: Combinatorial Fibonacci identities and Other Fibonacci identities
 Hypergeometric function identities
 List of integrals of logarithmic functions
 List of topics related to 
 List of trigonometric identities
 Inverse trigonometric functions
 Logarithmic identities
 Summation identities
 Vector calculus identities

See also

External links

 A Collection of Algebraic Identities
 Matrix Identities

Identities